The following is a list of notable beatboxers.

Groups 

  Bauchklang
   M.O.M.
  Beatbox House
  Home Free
  Pentatonix
  Soul Inscribed
  The House Jacks
  Berywam
  S.Q.U.I.D
  4thGAS
  Sarukani

Tag team

North America 
  Cookie Dough
  Dreamerz
  Equilibrium
  K-PoM
  Lightship
  SPIDERHORSE
  Blue Mountain Beatbox
  PRESIDENTAL HOST

Europe 
  Middle School
  Shadow Sumo
  BERY
   Rogue Wave
  Scam Talk
  UNITEAM
  ZEN'HIT
  Freedom of Sin
  Onii-Chan
  MAD TWINZ
  16BitZee
  A-CLOUD
  KOTCHA

Asia 
  Huskey
  Illdem
  Jo-Ws
  Rhythmination
  Rofu
  SORRY
  Wildcard guys
  2REAL
  Jackpot
  MNSTWNSS

All solo beatboxers

North America

  Ariel Pink
  Amit
  Biz Markie
  Balistix
  Beat Rhino
  BizKit
  Bloomer
  Butterscotch
  Chris Celiz
  ColinFX
  Buffy
  D-Koy
  D-Nice
  DJ B3AN
  Doug E. Fresh
  Gene Shinozaki
  HerShe
  Hunty
  Jeff Thacher
  JPizzle
  Justin Timberlake
  Kaila Mullady
  Kenny Urban
  Kevin Olusola
  Kid Lucky
  King Inertia
  Mark Martin
  Matisyahu
  MATCH
  Michael Winslow
  MisFire
  NaPoM
  Rahzel
  Ready Rock C
  Reggie Watts
  SungBeats
  Storm
  Timbaland
  us3r
  Villain
  Vocodah
  waferboi
  Wise
  Wes Carroll
  Wunknown
  ZVD 
  Andre Gibson
  Shield
  Atomic
  BBK
  DEN
  Elisii
  Heat
  JordoX
  KRNFX
  Mike Tompkins
  Scott Jackson
  Scribbly Doodle
  Vino
  BASS
  Mike
  Ownerbeatz
  Serous

Europe

  EON
  Geo Popoff
  Matej
  BigBen
  FootboxG
  Penkyx
  RoxorLoops
  Supernova
  Pe4enkata
  SkilleR
  M-Age
  Watt
  Crythix
  The Pounder
  Hertz
  KBA
  S
  Thorsen
  Yunus
  Akindé
  Alem
  Alexinho
  Beasty
  Beatness
  BMG
  BreZ
  Chris TheOdian
  Colaps
  DgyMie
  Efaybee
  Faya Braz
  Kenôzen
  K.I.M
  MB14
  PACMax
  River'
  Robin
  Rythmind
  Saro
  Tioneb
  Wawad
  Babeli
  Bee Low
  Chezame
  Friidon
  Madox
  SXIN
  Kristóf
  Döme
  Azel
  NME
  Slizzer
  B-Art
  Indicator
  Infernape
  Jarno Ibarra
  Voxel
  Chiwawa
  smplZ
  El Constantin
  Helium
  Improver
  Inkie
  Jayton
  Pash
  Routrine
  Taras Stanin
  Vahtang
  Gasper Grom
  Fredy Beats
  Lytos
  Markooz
  Zekka
  Marzel
  Pepouni
  ZeDe
  Balance
  Ball-Zee
  Bass Ventura
  Beardyman
  Contrix
  D-Low
  Frosty
  Hobbit
  Jay Sean
  Killa Kela
  milkman
  Reeps One
  Shlomo
  THePETEBOX
  BSFX
  M1klz
  Impaler

Asia

  Ah Xin
  Zhang Ze
  Heartgrey
  Teller
  Dilip Sahkrani
  Ish
  Vineeth Vincent
  CJ
  Kara
  Max
  DeMelllow
  Hippy
  Afra
  Hikakin
  Bataco
  CoLoA
  Crepsley
  Daichi
  Ettoman
  Fuga
  HIRO
  Hoguma
  John-T
  KAJI
  Kohey
  Mizuki
  momimaru
  Orothinyu
  Ray
  Rinka
  U-Ki
  RUSY
  Shimo-Ren
  Sh0h
  SHOW-GO
  SO-SO
  TATSUAKI
  TATSUYA
  Yamori
  Youkai Uraniarai
  Bigman
  Big Marvel
  Big Road
  Cloud
  DICE
  H-Has
  Hellcat
  Hiss
  Huckle
  Two.H
  WING
  Artsy
  Heartzel
  JP
  Stitch
  DA VINCI
  Lightmix
  Neil Llanes
  Roxorbeat
  Zyberus
  Mr.T
  Trung Bao
  Thai Son
  Sekerment
  Dharni
  Piratheeban
  Adi Kerang
  RAFLY
  Ego
  iaN
  Jimix
  Parker
  Ash Jacx
  Mayank Gupta
  Zer0

Australia

  Brunny
  Chills
  D-Wayne Beat
  J4FS
  Tom Thum
  Dub FX
  Joel Turner
  Codfish
  Sam Perry
  Saro
  DJ Shredder

South America
  André Pinguim
  Duckzy
  Dudz
  Penido
  Ex-BiTT
  Mr.Androide
  Tomazacre
  Waali
  Xiphire
  Jollux
  PWAD

Africa
  Thierry Olemba
  Ziad Swidan
  Enel
  Minko
  YF
  TOJ
  Syak
  ZigZap
  Remix

References

See also 

 List of hip-hop musicians
 Lists of musicians

Beatboxer